Āśrama is a system of stages of life discussed in Hindu texts of the ancient and medieval eras. The four asramas are: Brahmacharya (student), Gṛhastha (householder), Vanaprastha (forest walker/forest dweller), and Sannyasa (renunciate).

The Asrama system is one facet of the Dharma concept in Hinduism. It is also a component of the ethical theories in Indian philosophy, where it is combined with four proper goals of human life (Purushartha), for fulfilment, happiness and spiritual liberation. Moreover, since the four asramas can be seen as the framework of an influential life-span model, they are also part of an indigenous developmental psychology which from its ancient beginnings until today has shaped the orientations and goals of many people, especially in India.

Asrama system
Under the Asrama system, the human lifespan was divided into four periods. The goal of each period was the fulfilment and development of the individual. The classical system, in the Āśrama Upanishad, the Vaikhanasa Dharmasutra and the later Dharmashastra, presents these as sequential stages of human life and recommends ages for entry to each stage, while in the original system presented in the early Dharmasutras the Asramas were four alternative available ways of life, neither presented as sequential nor with age recommendations.

Asrama and Purushartha
The Asramas system is one facet of the complex Dharma concept in Hinduism. It is integrated with the concept of Purushartha, or four proper aims of life in Hindu philosophy, namely, Dharma (piety, morality, duties), Artha (wealth, health, means of life), Kama (love, relationships, emotions) and Moksha (liberation, freedom, self-realization). Each of the four Asramas of life are a form of personal and social environment, each stage with ethical guidelines, duties and responsibilities, for the individual and for the society. Each Asrama stage places different levels of emphasis on the four proper goals of life, with different stages viewed as steps to the attainment of the ideal in Hindu philosophy, namely Moksha.

Neither ancient nor medieval texts of India state that any of the first three Asramas must devote itself solely to a specific goal of life (Purushartha). The fourth stage of Sannyasa is different, and the overwhelming consensus  in ancient and medieval texts is that Sannyas stage of life must entirely be devoted to Moksha aided by Dharma.

Dharma is held primary for all stages. Moksha is the ultimate noble goal, recommended for everyone, to be sought at any stage of life. On the other two, the texts are unclear. With the exception of Kamasutra, most texts make no recommendation on the relative preference on Artha or Kama, that an individual must emphasise in what stage of life. The Kamasutra states,

See also

 Brahmacharya
 Grihastha
 Vanaprastha
 Sannyasa
 Purushartha
 Yamas
 Niyamas
 Hinduism
 Varna in Hinduism

Notes

References
 Chakkarath, Pradeep (2005). What can Western psychology Learn from Indigenous Psychologies? Lessons from Hindu psychology. In W. Friedlmeier, P. Chakkarath, & B. Schwarz (Eds.), Culture and Human Development: The Importance of Cross-cultural Research to the Social Sciences (pp. 31–51). New York: Psychology Press.
 Chakkarath, Pradeep (2013). Indian Thoughts on Psychological Human Development. In G. Misra (Ed.), Psychology and Psychoanalysis in India (pp. 167–190). New Delhi: Munshiram Manoharlal Publishers.

Further reading
 Patrick Olivelle (1993), The Āśrama System: The History and Hermeneutics of a Religious Institution, Oxford University Press, 
 Alain Daniélou (1993), Virtue, Success, Pleasure, and Liberation,

External links

 Four ashrama of yoga
 Pravritti-Nivritti Social action, inward contemplation and Asramas
 The Four Ashrams – ISKCON

Human life stages
 
Hindu philosophical concepts
Stage theories